Md. Shamsul Haque (29 January 1930 – 27 May 2004) was a Bangladesh Awami League politician and a Jatiya Sangsad member representing the Mymensingh-2 and Mymensingh-15 constituencies. He was elected to parliament from Mymensingh-11 as a Bangladesh Awami League candidate in 1991 and 1996.

Haque was awarded Ekushey Padak posthumously for his contribution to the Bengali language movement.

Background and career
Haque was born on 29 January 1930 in Tarakanda, Mymensingh. He studied in Ananda Mohan College. He was jailed for his involvement in the Bengali language movement.

Haque was five time Member of Parliament of Mymensingh-15 and Mymensingh-2. He served as the Fulpur Upzilla Parishad Chairman in 1988. His son Sharif Ahmed is serving as the Member of Parliament from  Mymensingh-2.

References

1930 births
2004 deaths
Awami League politicians
1st Jatiya Sangsad members
3rd Jatiya Sangsad members
5th Jatiya Sangsad members
7th Jatiya Sangsad members
Recipients of the Ekushey Padak
Place of death missing